Claudiopolis (Greek: , city of Claudius) was an ancient city of Cataonia mentioned by Ptolemy (v. 7).Its name suggests that it was named for the Roman emperor Claudius.

References

Ancient Greek archaeological sites in Turkey
Roman sites in Turkey